Alessia Amendola (born 27 February 1984) is an Italian voice actress.

Biography
Born in Rome, Amendola is the daughter of actor Claudio Amendola and the granddaughter of voice actors Ferruccio Amendola and Rita Savagnone.

Amendola started her career at quite a young age. She is the official Italian voice actress of Lindsay Lohan, Kat Dennings, Megan Fox, Amber Tamblyn, Elliot Page, Michelle Trachtenberg and Danielle Panabaker. Some of her well known Italian dubbed television roles include Max Black (portrayed by Kat Dennings) in 2 Broke Girls, Darlene Alderson (portrayed by Carly Chaikin) in Mr. Robot and Jess Day (portrayed by Zooey Deschanel) in New Girl.

In Amendola's film dubbing roles, she voiced Mikaela Banes (portrayed by Megan Fox) in the Transformers film franchise, Violet Parr in The Incredibles and Incredibles 2 and Gretchen Ross (portrayed by Jena Malone) in Donnie Darko. In her series dubbing roles, she dubbed Lindsay in the first four seasons of Total Drama.

Dubbing roles

Animation
Violet Parr in The Incredibles
Violet Parr in Incredibles 2
Piper Pinwheeler in Robots
Young Vitani in The Lion King II: Simba's Pride
Mikey Blumberg in Recess
Mikey Blumberg in Recess: All Growed Down
Lindsay in Total Drama (seasons 1-4)
Gwen Stacy in The Spectacular Spider-Man
Maid Marian in Tom and Jerry: Robin Hood and His Merry Mouse
Dawn in The Barbie Diaries
Lucy in Animal Kingdom: Let's Go Ape
Valerie Da Vinci in Despicable Me 3
Luisa Madrigal in Encanto 
Mai Lee in Scooby-Doo! Mystery Incorporated
Vexy in The Smurfs 2
Sara Lavrof in Tad, The Lost Explorer
Lara in Justin and the Knights of Valour
Cottontail in Peter Rabbit
Cottontail in Peter Rabbit 2: The Runaway
Tuca in Tuca & Bertie
Homura Akemi in Puella Magi Madoka Magica
Principal Stringent in ChalkZone

Live action
Maggie Peyton in Herbie: Fully Loaded
Anna Coleman in Freaky Friday
Lola Steppe in Confessions of a Teenage Drama Queen
Ashley Albright in Just My Luck
Diane Howser in Bobby
Rachel Wilcox in Georgia Rule
April Booth in Machete
Lindsay Lohan in Scary Movie 5
Tara in The Canyons
Katerina West in Sick Note
Casey Stuart in Life-Size
Hayley Stark in Hard Candy
Juno MacGuff in Juno
Libby / Boltie in Super
Ariadne in Inception
Monica in To Rome with Love
Izzy in The East
Stacie Andree in Freeheld
Courtney Holmes in Flatliners
Vanya Hargreeves in The Umbrella Academy
Mikaela Banes in Transformers
Mikaela Banes in Transformers: Revenge of the Fallen
Megan Fox in The Dictator
April O'Neil in Teenage Mutant Ninja Turtles
April O'Neil in Teenage Mutant Ninja Turtles: Out of the Shadows
Max Black in 2 Broke Girls
Norah in Nick & Norah's Infinite Playlist
Stacey Thompson in Shorts
Darcy Lewis in Thor
Darcy Lewis in Thor: The Dark World
Darcy Lewis in WandaVision
Gretchen Ross in Donnie Darko
Rocket in Sucker Punch
Casey Carlyle in Ice Princess
Kylie Shines in The Circuit
Maggie O'Donnell in 17 Again
Ava Monroe in Cop Out
Layla Williams in Sky High
Jane Brooks in Mr. Brooks
Becca in The Crazies
Sarah in The Ward
Brittany Aarons in Stuck in the Suburbs
Darcy Deeton in Searching for David's Heart
Joan Girardi in Joan of Arcadia
Tibby Rollins in The Sisterhood of the Traveling Pants 2
Kate in Ten Minutes Older: The Trumpet
Jenny Harper in Two and a Half Men
Sarah Russell in The Russell Girl
Darlene Alderson in Mr. Robot
Jess Day in New Girl
Zoey Brooks in Zoey 101
Jenny Humphrey in Gossip Girl
Lainey Lewis in The Goldbergs
Courtney Callum in Cow Belles
Jen Kaznyk in Super 8
Charlotte Drake in Pretty Little Liars
Mercedes Jones in Glee
Rebecca Harper in Brothers & Sisters
Emily Thorne in Revenge
Nic Nevin in The Resident
Andrea Jackson in The Big C
Odessa Montero in Tower Heist
Claireece "Precious" Jones in Precious
Emma Frost in X-Men: First Class
Dorothy Gale in The Muppets' Wizard of Oz
Jupiter Jones in Jupiter Ascending
Harmony in The House Bunny
Trudy Chacón in Avatar
Frank Kitchen in The Assignment
Carmen Lowell in The Sisterhood of the Traveling Pants
Carly Douglas in The Shaggy Dog
Luv in Blade Runner 2049
Sarah Connor in Terminator Genisys
Ree Dolly in Winter's Bone
Tiffany Maxwell in Silver Linings Playbook
Serena Pemberton in Serena
Dominika Egorova in Red Sparrow
Kristen Tilson in Cold Creek Manor
Maddy Phillips in Catch That Kid
Jess Solomon in The Messengers
London Tipton in The Suite Life of Zack & Cody
London Tipton in The Suite Life on Deck
London Tipton in The Suite Life Movie
Daphne Reynolds in What a Girl Wants
Amanda Bynes in The Amanda Show
Holly Tyler in What I Like About You
Bianca Stratford in 10 Things I Hate About You
Paige Dineen in Scorpion
Alice in Alice in Wonderland
Zoe in Solstice
Mary Darling in Pan
Patrice Dumas in BlacKkKlansman

Video games
Violet Parr in The Incredibles

References

External links
 
 
 

1984 births
Living people
Actresses from Rome
Italian voice actresses
Italian stage actresses
Italian radio presenters
Italian women radio presenters
Italian voice directors
20th-century Italian actresses
21st-century Italian actresses